The Stanstock Music Festival is a charitable event where multiple musical acts come together and play music to raise money for other nonprofit organizations, especially those that contribute toward pediatric cancer causes and veteran reintegration. The event is held near Baltimore, Maryland - most recently in Essex, and formerly in Parkville. The festival is overseen by Stanstock, Inc., a 501(c)(3) nonprofit charitable organization, with all staff and musicians working free of charge. It is unrelated to the Stanstock Music Festivals held in 2010 and 2011 in Chanhassen, MN.

History

Stanstock Music Festival and Stanstock, Inc. were originally envisioned by Stan Gibson, a former musician local to the Baltimore, Maryland area. As a youth and in his younger adult life, Gibson played instruments such as saxophone and flute in various local Baltimore bands from the late 1960s through 1980s. Gibson and his bands performed at multiple clubs, school dances, private parties, fairs, and weddings, usually playing covers of popular music of the day. While most of Gibson's interactions were with musicians local to Baltimore, he had the opportunity to meet John Denver on the Kerby Scott Show, where Gibson and his band Sindicate secured a gig in 1971.

As he aged, a congenital birth defect led to his being unable to continue playing instruments, as well as other declines in his health. Gibson eventually decided to start a Facebook page called Baltimore Bands of the 70's 80's 90's (sic) in 2012 to reconnect with other musicians. As of September 2019, the page has over 8,000 members. As the membership of the page increased, Gibson decided to organize and collaborate with its members to host a musical event to benefit other charities. The nonprofit Stanstock, Inc. was established, with the first Stanstock Music Festival held in 2013, and has occurred annually since, with the exception of the year 2020 during the COVID-19 coronavirus pandemic.

Beneficiaries
Stanstock, Inc. raises money through business sponsorship, online donations, raffles held on-site, sale of themed merchandise, and ticket sales for the Stanstock Music Festival.

In recent years, two charities received money from the Stanstock Music Festival:
 The Nicole Van Horn Foundation: This charity raises funding for research and services regarding pediatric cancer, and
 The Catch a Lift Fund: Catch a Lift provides gym memberships and equipment to help veterans rehabilitate and reintegrate into civilian life.

In 2014, the Wounded Warrior Project was also a financially benefiting charity.

Stanstock has additionally served as a platform for the Maryland 9/11 Rolling Memorial, which honors Marylanders who died on September 11, 2001, and soldiers who have since died in wars following the terrorist attacks on the United States.

Awards and recognition

Stanstock, Inc. and its founder, Stan Gibson, have received awards in recognition of its efforts to raise funding for pediatric cancer and also veteran rehabilitation. On September 20, 2015, Gibson was inducted into the Maryland Entertainment Hall of Fame, and received a Maryland Music Award for Outstanding Sponsorship in 2016. A Baltimore, Maryland author has also dedicated three of his books in part to Gibson.

The festival has received fanfare from newspapers, radio, and television.

Musical acts

Other guests and personalities

WBAL 11 Baltimore news anchor Stan Stovall visited Stanstock in 2016 as a guest emcee.

References 

Music festivals established in 2013
Music of Baltimore
2013 establishments in Maryland
Rock festivals in the United States
Festivals in Baltimore